Merey is a commune in the Eure department of the Normandy region in northern France.

History
As Madrie (Pagus Madriensis, later pays de Merey) it was a pagus in the north of Gaul lying between the Seine river and the rivers Eure and Iton. At the beginning of the fifth century, when the Notitia provinciarum was compiled, it was a Roman administrative division or  pagus of Provincia Lugdunensis Secunda.

In the ninth-century Carolingian Empire. In 822, Pepin, king of Aquitaine married Ingeltrude (also called Engelberga, Hringard, or Ringart), daughter of Theodobert, count of Madrie (c. 800-after 876), who was a son of Nibelung (Nivelan) of the royal house of the Burgundians.

It became part of Normandy in the 10th century and is now in the region called Normandy.

Population

Personalities
In 1694 Francois Quesnay was born at Merey.

See also
Communes of the Eure department

References

MSS Notitia provinciarum ecclesiasticarum bulliae

Communes of Eure